Twin Lakes may refer to:

Places

Canada
Twin Lakes (Nova Scotia)
Twin Lakes (Temagami)

Indonesia
  Twin Lakes (Lake Diatas and Lake Dibawah), aka Danau Kembar, West Sumatra

United Kingdom 
 Twinlakes Theme Park, in Melton Mowbray, Leicestershire

United States 
 Communities
Twin Lakes, California, Santa Cruz County
Twin Lakes, Mono County, California
Twin Lakes, Adams County, Colorado
Twin Lakes, Lake County, Colorado
Twin Lakes (Fort Lauderdale), Florida
Twin Lakes, Georgia
Twin Lakes, Indiana
Twin Lakes, Iowa
Twin Lakes, Kentucky
Twin Lakes, Minnesota
Twin Lakes, Ohio
Twin Lakes, Oklahoma
Twin Lakes, Wisconsin
Twin Lakes Township (disambiguation)

 Lakes
 Twin Lakes (Alaska)
 Twin Lakes (Bridgeport, California)
 Twin Lakes (El Dorado County, California)
 Twin Lakes (Mammoth Lakes, California)
 Twin Lakes (Colorado)
 Twin Lakes (Connecticut)
 Twin Lakes (Lake Wales, Florida)
 Twin Lakes (Idaho)
 Twin Lakes (Glacier National Park) in Glacier County, Montana
 Twin Lakes (Black Creek Lake, Herkimer County, New York)
 Twin Lakes (Portage County, Wisconsin)
 Twin Lakes (Baker County, Oregon)

Schools
Palm Beach Lakes Community High School, formerly Twin Lakes High School, in West Palm Beach, Florida

Companies
Twin Lakes Brewing Company
Twin Lakes, an ISP located in Tennessee